Yeniya Shorokhov (born 24 August 1974) is a Kyrgyzstani former hurdler. He competed in the men's 110 metres hurdles at the 1996 Summer Olympics.

References

External links
 

1974 births
Living people
Athletes (track and field) at the 1996 Summer Olympics
Kyrgyzstani male hurdlers
Olympic athletes of Kyrgyzstan
Place of birth missing (living people)
Athletes (track and field) at the 1994 Asian Games
Asian Games competitors for Kyrgyzstan